Some Enchanted Evening is the tenth solo studio album by Art Garfunkel, released in 2007. It is Garfunkel's interpretation of many standards of the Great American Songbook. It was produced by long-time friend and producer Richard Perry.

Track listing 
"I Remember You" (Johnny Mercer, Victor Schertzinger) – 2:58
"Someone to Watch Over Me" (George Gershwin, Ira Gershwin) – 3:24
"Let's Fall in Love" (Harold Arlen, Ted Koehler) – 2:28
"I'm Glad There Is You" (Jimmy Dorsey, Paul Mandeira) – 3:45
"Quiet Nights of Quiet Stars (Corcovado)" (Antonio Carlos Jobim, Gene Lees) – 3:03
"Easy Living" (Leo Robin, Ralph Rainger) – 3:38
"I've Grown Accustomed to Her Face" (Alan Jay Lerner, Frederick Loewe) – 2:49
"You Stepped Out of a Dream" (Gus Kahn, Nacio Herb Brown) – 2:46
"Some Enchanted Evening" (Richard Rodgers, Oscar Hammerstein II) – 3:35
"It Could Happen to You" (Johnny Burke, Jimmy Van Hansen) – 2:31
"Life Is But a Dream" (Raoul Cita, Hy Weiss) – 3:44
"What'll I Do" (Irving Berlin) – 3:04
"If I Loved You" (Richard Rodgers, Oscar Hammerstein II) – 3:10
"While We're Young" (Alec Wilder, Bill Engvick, Morty Palitz) - 3:42 [Bonus track from Target - exclusive edition]

Personnel

Musicians
Art Garfunkel – vocals
Dean Parks – guitar (Tracks 1–3, 6–12)
Bob Glaub – bass guitar (Tracks 1–3, 6–8, 10)
Michael Thompson – piano, Fender Rhodes, guitar, synthesizer (Tracks 1–8, 10–12)
Steve Gadd – drums (Tracks 1–3, 5–7, 10–12)
Chris Smith – harmonica (Track 1)
Doug Webb – soprano saxophone, flute, woodwind (Tracks 1, 5–6, 8, 10)
Alex Navarro – keyboards, piano, synthesizer (Tracks 2, 4–13)
Frank Simes – guitar (Track 2, 13)
Maia Sharp – tenor saxophone (Track 2)
Randy Kerber – synthesizer, keyboards, bass guitar, programming (Tracks 4, 7, 9)
Lee Thornburg – trumpet (Track 4)
Nick Sample – programming, bass guitar (Tracks 5, 8)
Michael Montilla – percussion (Track 9)
Richard Perry – Producer (All tracks), bass, vocal (Track 11)
Chris Golden – bass guitar (Tracks 12, 13)

2007 albums
Art Garfunkel albums
Albums produced by Richard Perry
Atco Records albums